Ratna Deepam is a 1953 Indian Tamil-language film directed by Debaki Bose. The film stars Abhi Bhattacharya and Anupama.

Plot 
A son in a rich family has gone missing for a long time. A man intrudes into the family feigning as their lost son. He enjoys life with the wealth in the family. However, when the wife approaches him with trust and affection his conscience demands a hearing. Even though he is an imposter he does not want to take advantage of the wife's innocence. Finally it is a victory to the conscience.

Cast 
List adapted from the database of Film News Anandan.

Male cast
Abhi Bhattacharya
Pahari Sanyal
S. P. K. Rao
S. P. K. Murthi

Female cast
Anupama
Manju
Molina
Chaya Devi

Production 
The film was produced and directed by Debaki Bose. Story was written by Prabathkumar Chatterjee and the dialogues were penned by Kannadasan, T. M. Balasubramaniam and Eswara Chandra Sastry. Cinematography was handled by Theoji Bai while the editing was done by Kamal Ganguly and Govardhan Adhikari. Art direction was by Sathyan Rai Choudry. Adhinlal was in charge of choreography. The film was made by Radha Films at New Theatres, Calcutta.

The film was also made in Bengali with the title Ratna Deep and released in 1951.

Soundtrack 
Music was composed by Robin Chatterjee while the lyrics were penned by Valampuri Somanathan, Vijayakumar and Papanasam Sivan. A song by Subramania Bharathiyar also was included in the film.

Reception 
The Indian Express wrote, "Portions of the picture have been dubbed in Tamil and this has been done so well as to make it hardly noticeable. The picture has all the flavour of a first hand effort."

References 

1950s Tamil-language films